Kordić is a Croatian and Montenegrin surname . It can refer to:

Stevan Kordić (born 1969), Montenegrin photographer and member of numerous associations dedicated to the preservation of the cultural heritage Bay of Kotor. He is a lifelong member of the pan-European association Europa Nostra.
Dan Kordic (born 1971) and John Kordic (1965-1992), two Croatian Canadian brothers who were hockey players.
Dario Kordić (born 1971), a Bosnian-Croat politician and a convicted war criminal
Krešimir Kordić (born 1981),  Bosnian-Herzegovinian footballer
Snježana Kordić (born 1964), Croatian linguist

References